The following is a complete list of units and commanders who fought in the battle of Solferino on June 24, 1859.

French Army
Emperor Napoleon III
Chief of Staff: Jean-Baptiste Philibert Vaillant

Imperial Guard
Auguste Regnaud de Saint-Jean d'Angély

I Corps
Achille Baraguey d'Hilliers

II Corps
Patrice de MacMahon

III Corps
François Certain Canrobert

IV Corps
Adolphe Niel

Piedmont-Sardinian Army
King Victor Emmanuel II
Minister of War: Alfonso Ferrero La Marmora

Austrian Army
Emperor Franz Joseph
Adjutant General: Karl Ludwig von Grünne
Quartermaster General: Heinrich von Heß

First Army
Franz Graf von Wimpffen

II Corps
Liechtenstein

III Corps
Schwartzenberg

IX Corps
Schaffgotsche

X Corps
Wernhardt

XI Corps
Weigl

Second Army
Franz Schlik

I Corps
Clam-Gallas

V Corps
Stadion

VII Corps
Zobel

VIII Corps
Ludwig von Benedek

References

 Battle of Solferino

Battles of the Second Italian War of Independence
Orders of battle